Eduard Clemens Franz Anna Freiherr von Wangenheim (1 August 1871 – 22 July 1961), known as Eduard von Winterstein,  was an Austrian-German film actor who appeared in over one hundred fifty German films during the silent and sound eras. He was also a noted theater actor.

Biography 

Von Winterstein was born in Vienna on 1 August 1871 to landowner Hugo von Wangenheim and his second wife, Hungarian-born actress Aloysia "Luise" von Wangenheim-Dub. His predecessors were the Barons of Wangenheim. He took acting lessons from his mother, who had played at the Burgtheater in Vienna. Winterstein came to Gera in 1889 and acted in theaters along with his mother and sister Clementine, where he had "undeservedly forgotten" experiences. He acted in the play  in 1893. The same year, he played the title role in Egmont at the opening of a theater in Annaberg on 2 April 1893. "I was re-born in Annaberg and became like a completely different person. In this small town I had really become an actor. [...] So the Anna Berger time was one of the best in my profession." he wrote in his autobiography. At this theater he met the actress Minna Menger, whom he married in 1894. They had a son, Gustav von Wangenheim (1895–1975), who went on to become an actor. The Theater in Annaberg-Buchholz is named  today.

From 1895, he played at the Schiller Theater which had signed him for a three-year contract and from 1898 at the Deutsches Theater in Berlin under Otto Brahm. He married Hedwig Pauly (1866–1965) in 1899. Next he worked at the Lessing theater and acted in Gorky's The Lower Depths at Max Reinhardt's Kleines Theater. Later he worked under Max Reinhardt. When he moved up Winterstein enthusiastically commented about the country with the following words:
Berlin! It was at that time much more than today, the long-awaited paradise, after each German actor strove with all their might... Here in the big city flourished a lively theater life. The theater almanac from 1895 lists twenty-four theaters for Berlin. [...] I had found temporary accommodation with relatives with my family in the Großbeerenstraße... I was happy that I was just in Berlin to debut in this role (as Tellheim in Minna von Barnhelm)."

He taught acting from 1905 to 1920 at a theater school founded by Max Reinhardt. From 1913, Winterstein also started acting in films. In the period after the Second World War, he worked with the ensemble of the Deutsches Theater. There he played the role of Nathan approximately four hundred times. He won the Best male actor award at the Film Festival in Karlovy Vary for his portrayal of the title role in Die Sonnenbrucks (1951). He soon became a popular German film actor and was cast to play the roles of energetic elders as generals, judges, landlords and directors. He won the national award thrice  for his acting in Georg C. Klaren-directed Semmelweis - Retter der Mütter (1950), Wolfgang Staudte-directed Der Untertan (film) (1951) and Martin Hellberg-directed . Unlike the theater, however, Winterstein's appearances were limited in the film mostly on a few scenes. He appeared in 150 films and was the part of various intercom panel discussions, including even in old age the ring story from Nathan the Wise for the East German recording label . His last film was Der schweigende Stern (1960).

Winterstein deliberately chose a life in East Germany, a fact of which the country's cultural policy took advantage. After his death, Neues Deutschland gave him a special, with the title "The Better Choice". Its final passage reads:I have experienced a lot of changes: under three emperors, the first world war, the pseudo-democracy of the Second Empire, the Weimar Republic, the terrible twelve years of National Socialism and that induced the complete collapse of the German Empire, until I take sigh of relief from free will and will join the new progressive spirit and am now proud to call a citizen of the German Democratic Republic and this is insight and reason for choosing the better.

A street in Potsdam is named in his honour.

Selected filmography 

 Werner Krafft (1916) as Werner Krafft
 The Giant's Fist (1917) as Diether von Brake
 The Coquette (1917)
 Prostitution (1919)
 The Mask (1919) as Count Campobello
 Blonde Poison (1919) as Chauffeur
 During My Apprenticeship (1919)
 The Monastery of Sendomir (1919)
 Irrlicht (1919)
 Madeleine (1919)
 President Barrada (1920)
 Battle of the Sexes (1920)
 Mary Tudor (1920) as Simon Renard
 The Yellow Death (1920) as Officer Karpuschkin
 Figaros Hochzeit (1920)
 Intrigue (1920) as Der Gatte
 Mary Magdalene (1920) as Master Anton
 Hamlet (1921) as King Claudius
 Lady Godiva (1921) as the duke
 Danton (1921) as General Westermann
 The Devil and Circe (1921)
 The White Death (1921) as the father
 The Stranger from Alster Street (1921)
 The Adventuress of Monte Carlo (1921) as Rimay
 The False Dimitri (1922) as Boyard Bielsky 
 The Diadem of the Czarina (1922)
 The Fire Ship (1922)
 Bigamy (1922)
 The Strumpet's Plaything (1922)
 The White Desert (1922) as Iwan
 Circus People (1922)
 The Stream (1922)
 Fridericus Rex (1922) as Leopold I, Prince of Anhalt-Dessau 
 Gold and Luck (1923) as Bauer
 William Tell (1923) as Werner Stauffacher
 The Treasure of Gesine Jacobsen (1923) as Doctor Holgersen
 The Path to God (1924) as Thomas Balt
 Guillotine (1924) as Prosecutor Laroche
 The Little Duke (1924) as Commandant von Trucschicz
 Garragan (1924)
 Claire (1924)
 A Free People (1925) as Administrator von Nehling
 What the Stones Tell (1925) as General Wrangel
 People in Need (1925) as General Samsonov
 Goetz von Berlichingen of the Iron Hand (1925)
 Ash Wednesday (1925) as the commander
 Destiny (1925) as Minister von Glayn
 Wallenstein (1925) as Terzky
 The Mill at Sanssouci (1926) as Leopold I, Prince of Anhalt-Dessau
 Fedora (1926)
 The Woman in Gold (1926)
 Women of Passion (1926) 
 The Adventurers (1926) as Karl Lüttgen
 The Fallen (1926) as the magistrate
 I Liked Kissing Women (1926) as Franz Hartwig
 The House of Lies (1926) as Dr. Helling
 The Bohemian Dancer (1926) as Gamekeeper Lange
 The Master of Death (1926) as Colonel von Hersdorff
 The Good Reputation (1926)
 Mademoiselle Josette, My Woman (1926)
 Lützow's Wild Hunt (1927) as Gebhard Leberecht von Blücher
 Tragedy of a Marriage (1927)
 The Pink Slippers (1927) as the head gamekeeper
 A Girl of the People (1927) as General Laudon
 On the Banks of the River Weser (1927) 
 That Was Heidelberg on Summer Nights (1927) as Lord Wagner
 Prinz Louis Ferdinand (1927) as Scharnhorst
 A Day of Roses in August (1927) as Major von Rudow
 The Mysterious Mirror (1928) as the lord
 Master and Mistress (1928)
 Napoleon at St. Helena (1929) as Gebhard Leberecht von Blücher
 The Blue Angel (1930) as the school's director
 The Other (1930) as Dr. Koehler
 Darling of the Gods (1930) as Dr. Marberg
 Him or Me (1930) as R.A. Wilken
 Love's Carnival (1930) as Commandant von Friese
 Road to Rio (1931) as the police commissioner
 In the Employ of the Secret Service (1931) as the spy's chief
 Between Night and Dawn (1931) as the father
 Sacred Waters (1932) as Peter Waldisch
 Trenck (1932) as Wilhelm Heinrich Freiherr von der Goltz
 The White Demon (1932) as the Marquis d'Esquillon
 The First Right of the Child (1932)
 Secret Agent (1932) as 	Professor Managan
 Man Without a Name (1932) as the judge
 Frederica (1933) as Capitain Knebel
 Spies at Work (1933) as Commandant von Waldmüller
 The Roberts Case (1933) as Burgomaster Bergmann
 The Judas of Tyrol (1933) as Kreutzwirt
 At the Strasbourg (1934)  as Jacob Rusti
 The Rider on the White Horse (1934) as the mayor
 The Last Waltz (1934) as General Dymoff
 The Higher Command (1935) as Major
 Regine (1935) as Keller
 His Late Excellency (1935) as Count Seefeld
 The Girl from the Marsh Croft (1935) as Mr. Gerhart
 Hundred Days (1935) 
 The Schimeck Family (1935)
 Trouble Backstairs (1935) as Judge Muller
 Martha (1936)
 Ninety Minute Stopover (1936)
 Winter in the Woods (1936) as the gamekeeper
 Der Etappenhase (1937) as Major Grothe
 Madame Bovary (1937) as Huret
 The Man Who Was Sherlock Holmes (1937) as the supreme judge
 The Coral Princess (1937) as Vukowitsch
 Serenade (1937) as the doctor
 The Marriage Swindler (1938)  as Franz Buschko
 The Man Who Couldn't Say No (1938)
 Napoleon Is to Blame for Everything (1938) as Mister Harrison
 A Prussian Love Story (1938) as General von Gneisenau
 The Green Emperor (1939) as the second judge
 Liberated Hands (1939) as Lord von Erken
 Robert Koch (1939) as Prof. Ernst von Bergmann
 D III 88 (1939) as Landarzt
 The Journey to Tilsit (1939) as Erwin Bohrmann
 In the Name of the People (1939)
 The Immortal Heart (1939)
 The Merciful Lie (1939)
 Das Herz der Königin (1940) as the English general
 The Girl from Barnhelm (1940)
 Bismarck (1940) as General von Manstein
 Kopf hoch, Johannes! (1941)
 Ohm Krüger (1941) as Commandant Cronje
 Andreas Schlüter (1942) as Naumann
 Rembrandt (1942) as Ratsherr van Straaten
 Münchhausen (1943) as Munchausen's father
 When the Young Wine Blossoms (1943)
 Philharmonic (1944)
 Hoegler's Mission (1950)
 Die Sonnenbrucks (1951)
 Der Untertan (1951)
 Das Lied der Matrosen (1958)
 First Spaceship on Venus (1959) as the nuclear physicist

References

External links 

 
 

1871 births
1961 deaths
Male actors from Vienna
Barons of Austria
Austrian male film actors
Austrian male silent film actors
Austrian male stage actors
20th-century Austrian male actors
German male film actors
German male silent film actors
German male stage actors
Austrian emigrants to Germany
Recipients of the Patriotic Order of Merit in silver
Recipients of the National Prize of East Germany
20th-century German male actors